Żelazów  is a village in the administrative district of Gmina Korytnica, within Węgrów County in Masovian Voivodeship, east-central Poland.

Geography 

History 
The village has been in the past a temporary location of the administrative district of Jaczew County. In the years  1975-1998 Żelazów has been - by administrative division - part of the Siedlce Voivodeship.

References

Villages in Węgrów County